Goniothalamus cheliensis is a species of plant in the Annonaceae family. It is native to China and Thailand. Bioactive molecules isolated from its roots have been reported to have cytotoxic activity in tests with cultured human cancer cells.

Description
It has large leaves, 50-76 by 13-22 centimeters, that are densely hairy on their underside.  It also has large flowers.  Its sepals are 30-40 by 28-30 millimeters and its outer petals are 60-80 by 30-40 millimeters.

Reproductive biology
The pollen of G. cheliensis is shed as permanent tetrads.

References

cheliensis
Flora of China
Flora of Thailand
Endangered plants
Taxonomy articles created by Polbot